The Africa Team Table Tennis Championships is a Tournaments organized by the African Table Tennis Federation (ATTF) To Crown Africa Best Table tennis Nations.

Medalists

References

External links
African Table Tennis Federation (ATTF)

African championships
Table tennis in Africa
Recurring sporting events established in 1962